Charles Krüger (9 March 1896 – 8 March 1990) was a Luxembourgian footballer. He competed in the men's tournament at the 1920 Summer Olympics.

References

External links
 

1896 births
1990 deaths
Luxembourgian footballers
Luxembourg international footballers
Olympic footballers of Luxembourg
Footballers at the 1920 Summer Olympics
Sportspeople from Luxembourg City
Association football goalkeepers